Gonfienti is a frazione (detached village) located in the suburbs of the town of Prato.   The actor Giorgio Panariello lives here.

Main sights
Remains of the Etruscan city of Camars
San Martino church. Of ancient origin, it was rebuilt in the 13th century and renewed between the 18th and 19th century. Two altarpieces from the 15th and 16th century, realized by the school of Giovanni Balducci or Giovan Pietro Naldini, are preserved inside.
The Prato freight village, one of the biggest in Tuscany, is located in the surroundings of Gonfienti. From here it is possible to observe the Cemetery in the locality La Macine.
An old villa belonged to Novellucci family is located in Gonfienti. It is now under restorations.

Prato
Frazioni of the Province of Prato